Frederiksberg IF is a Danish sports club based in Frederiksberg. 
The women's handball team has won the Danish Danish Women's Handball League 15 times. The club has raised a host of A-national team players on both sides, with Camilla Andersen, Mette Vestergaard, Bo Spellerberg and Kasper White as the currently most prominent.

References

External links 
Official website 
EHF Men's Team Profile 
EHF Women's Team Profile 

Danish handball clubs